, officially Minami or South Iōtō (written with the same characters) since 18 June 2007 and also formerly known as Santo Agustino, is a  uninhabited island in the North Pacific.

Occupied by the United States Armed Forces following World War II, South Iwo Jima was restored to Japanese control in 1968. It is now administered as part of Ogasawara Subprefecture in the Tokyo Metropolitan Government.

Description
The island lies 1300 km south of Tokyo,  SSW of Chichijima. Along the shoreline there are few bays and inlets, and it is covered with mostly rocks and little sand. The peak on South Iwo Jima is the largest in Ogasawara Subprefectureincluding the Bonin and Volcano Islands and three isolated isletsat  and its average slope angle is 45 degrees. The northwest side of this volcano, which has a relatively stable shape and is not eroding much, rises at a gentler incline of 30 degrees. Another defining feature of the island is that it does not have rivers, lakes, marshes or a freshwater system of any kind.

South Iwo Jima is part of a volcanic front which has been active for 2,588,000 years beginning in the Quaternary period and started to form as a result of volcanic activity in that period. Though it is not clear when it emerged as an island, rocks which have been gathered and analyzed show no signs of geomagnetic reversal, so it is believed that the island is no more than a few hundred thousands years old. Although Micronesians may have passed the island in the past, South Iwo Jima is first known to have been discovered in late September or early October 1543 by Spanish explorer Bernardo de la Torre on board the carrack  during a failed attempt to find a northern route east from the Philippines to Mexico.

Environment
The island is a treasure house of precious animals and plants because it has not been developed historically due to its geographical isolation from mainland Japan, steep topography, and severe weather conditions. The upper part of the island is often covered with clouds and fog, and the ecosystem differs from elevation to elevation. Because of this, the entire area of the island has been designated by the Japanese government as a Nature Conservation Area of Forest Ecosystem in Ogasarawa-Islands and access to the island is strictly restricted, with only a limited number of scientists authorized by the government and mountain experts supporting them being allowed to land on the island. To date, serious academic research has been conducted only four times: in 1936, 1982, 2007, and 2017. Since all the survey routes are from the southwestern coast to the summit of the island, which is relatively easy to climb, most of the island is unexplored except for the coastal area. In 2017, the first drone survey of an unexplored region of the island was conducted. The island forms part of the Volcano Islands (Kazan-retto) Important Bird Area (IBA), designated by BirdLife International.

In popular culture 
South Iwo Jima is the location of Mahoutokoro, the Japanese school of witchcraft and wizardry in the fictional universe of Harry Potter. Mahoutokoro, the shiro or castle, is located on the peak of the extinct volcano and is constructed of pure white jade and surrounded by stormy seas, without any Muggle inhabitants, and very close to a Japanese Air Force base.

An episode of the television show The Time Tunnel, called "Kill Two by Two", was set on South Iwo Jima, although in the show it was depicted as a lush tropical island with lots of vegetation and fresh water.

See also

 Iwo Jima
 Desert island
 List of islands
 Fukutoku-Okanoba, nearby ephemeral island
 List of volcanoes in Japan

References

External links
 S. Iwo Jima page in Japanese

Volcano Islands
Uninhabited islands of Japan
Islands of Tokyo
Important Bird Areas of the Nanpo Islands